Svein Langholm is a Norwegian former professional racing cyclist. He won the Norwegian National Road Race Championship in 1975.

References

External links

Year of birth missing (living people)
Living people
Norwegian male cyclists
Place of birth missing (living people)